Pangio pangia is a species of ray-finned fish in the genus Pangio, of which it is the type species. It is found in India, Bangladesh and Myanmar.

Footnotes 

Pangio
Fish described in 1822